The Maraimalai Adigal Bridge (previously the Marmalong Bridge) is a road bridge on Anna Salai connecting the northern and southern banks of the Adyar River.

History 
The oldest bridge across the Adyar River - the Marmalong Bridge - was originally constructed by the Armenian merchant Coja Petrus Uscan in 1728 at the cost of Rs. one lakh. The bridge was named after the nearby village of Mambalam which was Anglicized to Marmalan or Marmalong. The dilapidated old bridge was replaced by a new one in 1966. The new bridge is named after Maraimalai Adigal, a Tamil writer and proponent of the Pure Tamil movement.

Uscan's construction of the bridge is commemorated by a plaque at the northern end of the bridge adjoining the Saidapet bus stand.

Notes

Other sources 

 

Road bridges in India
Bridges in Tamil Nadu
Bridges and flyovers in Chennai